The Kulm Hotel St. Moritz is a large historic hotel in St. Moritz, Switzerland.

The hotel is a 5* luxury hotel. located in the Engadin valley in southern Switzerland. It is very close to the St. Moritz–Corviglia Funicular, which provides access to the main skiing area. It is also close to Lake St. Moritz and hiking trails at Via Alpina. The name "Kulm" derives from the Latin word "culmen", which means "hill". The hotel provides good views of the local lake and the Albula Alps. The hotel has been featured on the BBC television programme Amazing Hotels: Life Beyond the Lobby.

See also
 Badrutt's Palace Hotel
 Historic Hotels of Europe

References

External links
 Kulm Hotel St. Moritz website 

Year of establishment missing
Luxury hotels
Hotels in Switzerland
Buildings and structures in Graubünden
Tourist attractions in Graubünden
St. Moritz